Lakshmi Vandhachu  is a 1986 Indian Tamil-language comedy drama film directed by Rajasekhar. The film stars Revathi in the title role along with Sivaji Ganesan and Padmini. It is a remake of the 1980 Hindi film Khubsoorat. The film was released on 1 November 1986.

Plot 

Rajeshwari is the strict disciplinarian of the family that keeps everyone under her control – particularly her husband Rajasekhar. Her four sons live by her rules without question. When her second son marries, his new wife's younger sister Lakshmi comes to stay with the family. Lakshmi's carefree and easy going attitude endears her to family but puts her at odds with Rajeshwari. Raja, the family's third son and Lakshmi also fall in love. One of Lakshmi's pranks pushes Rajeshwari to her limit and creates fissures in the family. A crisis eventually sets things in motion to solve all the problems.

Cast 
Sivaji Ganesan as Rajasekhar
Padmini as Rajeshwari
Revathi as Lakshmi
Nizhalgal Ravi as Raja
Khaja Sharif as Jagan
V. K. Ramasamy as Ramanathan
Jayachitra as Chithra
Senthil  as Renga
Chinni Jayanth as Gilbert
Kovai Sarala as Valli
Ganga K as Sarasu
S. Ve. Shekher as Shekhar
Meena as Meena
Ra. Sankaran as Mudhaliar

Soundtrack 
Soundtrack was composed by Raveendran.

Reception 
T. S. V. Hari of The Indian Express wrote, "To such a goody goody tale, the Tamil version adds its own brand of gutter humour, which instead of tickling the ribs, leaves wounds on the sides". Jayamanmadhan of Kalki wrote Revathi has chirpiness. Well, Padmini has sparkle. OK, Shivaji has variety, right. However, it seems that an elephant sized injection should be given to make the screenplay active, where can we go and say this?.

References

External links 
 

1980s Tamil-language films
1985 films
1986 comedy-drama films
Films directed by Rajasekhar (director)
Films scored by Raveendran
Indian comedy-drama films
Tamil remakes of Hindi films